Doğubayazıt District is a district of Ağrı Province of Turkey. Its seat is the town Doğubayazıt. It is the easternmost district of Turkey, lying near the border with Iran. Its area is 2,250 km2, and its population is 118,643 (2021). The current Kaymakam is Murat Ekinci.

Composition
There is one municipality in Doğubayazıt District:
 Doğubayazıt

There are 85 villages in Doğubayazıt District:

 Aktarla
 Aktuğlu
 Alıntepe
 Aşağıtavla
 Atabakan
 Ayrancı
 Bardaklı
 Barındı
 Başköy
 Bereket
 Besler
 Bezirhane
 Binkaya
 Bozkurt
 Bozyayla
 Bölücek
 Bulakbaşı
 Buyuretti
 Çalıköy
 Çetenli
 Çiftlikköy
 Çömçeli
 Dağdelen
 Dalbahçe
 Demirtepe
 Dolaklı
 Dostali
 Eskisu
 Esnemez
 Gökçekaynak
 Göller
 Gölyüzü
 Gözükara
 Güllüce
 Gültepe
 Güngören
 Günyolu
 Gürbulak
 Hallaç
 Incesu
 Kalecik
 Karabulak
 Karaburun
 Karaca
 Karakent
 Karaseyh
 Kargakonmaz
 Kazan
 Kızılkaya
 Kucak
 Kutlubulak
 Melikşah
 Mescitköy
 Ortadirek
 Ortaköy
 Örmeli
 Örtülü
 Pullutarla
 Sağdıç
 Sağlıksuyu
 Sarıbıyık
 Sarıçavuş
 Sazoba
 Seslitaş
 Somkaya
 Subeşiği
 Suluçem
 Tanıktepe
 Telçeker
 Topçatan
 Tulumlu
 Tutak
 Uzunyazı
 Üçgöze
 Üçmurat
 Üzengili
 Yağmurdüşen
 Yalınsaz
 Yanoba
 Yaygınyurt
 Yeniharman
 Yığınçal
 Yılanlı
 Yiğityatağı
 Yukarıtavla

References

Districts of Ağrı Province